Giedrius is a Lithuanian masculine given name and may refer to the following individuals:
Giedrius Andriunaitis (born 1991), Lithuanian swimmer
Giedrius Arlauskis (born 1987), Lithuanian football goalkeeper
Giedrius Barevičius (born 1976), Lithuanian football midfielder
Giedrius Gustas (born 1980), Lithuanian basketball point guard and shooting guard
Giedrius Gužys (born 1976), Lithuanian sport sailor
Giedrius Kuprevičius (born 1944), Lithuanian composer and music educator
Giedrius Matulevičius (born 1997), Lithuanian footballer 
Giedrius Staniulis (born 1991), Lithuanian basketball player
Giedrius Titenis (born 1989), Lithuanian swimmer and Olympic competitor
Giedrius Tomkevičius (born 1984), Lithuanian football midfielder 
Giedrius Žutautas (born 1974), Lithuanian footballer defender

Lithuanian masculine given names